Hero is a 2022 Indian Telugu-language action comedy film written and directed by Sriram Adittya. Produced by Amara Raja Media and Entertainment, the film stars debutant Ashok Galla and Nidhhi Agerwal while Jagapathi Babu, Naresh, Vennela Kishore, Brahmaji, and Satya play supporting roles with the music composed by Ghibran.

The film began its production in November 2019. Following the delays caused by the COVID-19 pandemic, Hero was theatrically released on 15 January 2022. The film received mixed reviews from the critics and audiences as well.

Plot
Arjun is a struggling actor who is in love with Subhadra alias Subbu. Saleem Bhai Savyasachi, a crime boss in Mumbai, kills the Police Commissioner with an flintlock gun and sends the gun to Hyderabad to assassinate one of his enemies. Arjun orders a hair oil to treat his hair fall but receives the gun in courier due to mistaken identity. He discusses the problem with his friend at night on his terrace. A CI harasses a lone woman at night in their colony. Arjun's friend, who is drunk, couldn't understand the problem, where he accidentally shoots the CI while snatching the gun from his friend. He tries to report the incident to the police but withdraws after realizing that he shot the CI. He tries to toss away the gun but fails to do so. 

Meanwhile, the hitman also named Arjun, receives the hair oil instead of the gun and investigates the matter. Arjun receives another parcel with the photo of Sripati, Subbu's father and is ordered to kill him. Arjun (hitman) finds Arjun's home and holds him at gunpoint while Arjun's parents return from a movie and find the gangsters in their house. Arjun convinces them that they are from the shooting crew. The gangsters leave with the courier, but Arjun changes the photo of their target. Sripati acts as he suffers from heart stroke in a bid to leave for US with reluctant Subbu. The gangsters realize their mistake but decide to help Arjun. They inform him that Saleem Bhai hired another assassin to kill Sripati. 

Arjun and his family along with Subbu's father leave for a temple shrine where after secretly defeating the goons, Arjun finds the assassin to be CI and saves Sripati from him. Subbu's mother then reveals to everyone that Sripati dreamt of becoming an actor and finally landed a lead role in Saleem Bhai's biopic. His car breaks down on the first day of filming and he travels with the Police Commissioner who attacks Saleem Bhai, who swears vengeance on Sripati. Sripati then boards a train to Mumbai and Arjun tries to convince him to return. They later realize that it's a shooting spot and the train isn't going anywhere. Saleem Bhai attacks them at the railway station but they defeat him. Impressed with their performance, the producer of the film offers them roles in his film. Arjun and Subbu reunite and he and Sripati finally become actors.

Cast 

 Ashok Galla as Arjun
 Nidhhi Agerwal as Subhadra "Subbu"
 Jagapathi Babu as Sripati, Subbu's father
 Naresh as Arjun's father
 Archana Ananth as Sarada, Arjun's mother
 Vennela Kishore as Telemarketing guy
 Brahmaji as a film actor
 Satya as Arjun's friend
 Ravi Kishan as Saleem Bhai
 Mime Gopi as Arjuna, a goon
 Kota Srinivasa Rao as Arjuna's father
 Raghu Karumanchi as Arjuna's henchmen
 Srikanth Iyengar as Mumbai Police
 Kausalya as Subbu's mother
 Ajay as Police CI
 Prabhakar as Police Officer
 Satyam Rajesh as Subbu's fiance
 Viva Harsha as a forest thief
 Chammak Chandra as a clinic worker
 K. Sivasankar as a dance master (posthumous)
 Anil Ravipudi in a cameo appearance as a film director

Production 
Hero marks the debut of Mahesh Babu's nephew Ashok Galla, the son of businessman and politician Galla Jayadev. Sriram Aditya (who earlier directed Bhale Manchi Roju, Samanthakamani and Devadas) was signed to helm the film while actress Nidhhi Agerwal was cast opposite Galla. It is produced by Padmavathi Galla under Amar Raja Media and Entertainment as their maiden venture. The film began its production in November 2019 in Hyderabad with an estimated budget of 3.5 crore. Galla's grandfather and veteran actor Krishna visited the film's sets and directed a scene on Aditya's request. Aditya described the film as "a romantic potboiler with a hidden twist towards the end."

The film began its post-production in June 2021, and the title was unveiled as Hero.

Soundtrack

Release 
The film was initially scheduled to release on 26 January 2022, however, owing to the postponement of other major films like RRR, Hero release date was advanced to 15 January 2022, coinciding with the festival of Sankranti.

Reception 
The film received mixed reviews from critics praising the cast performances, visuals, humour and action sequences, but criticize the latter half and termed it as silly.

Neeshita Nyayapati of The Times of India, rated the film 3/5 and wrote, "Hero had the potential to be a film that keeps you on the edge of your seat while ensuring you leave the cinema hall having laughed your heart out." A Sakshi critic appreciated the direction, screenplay and performances, with a particular praise to the film's humour. A reviewer from Eenadu also echoed the same but felt that the latter half was too silly for a serious subject. Pinkvilla concluded its review by writing, "If you watch 'Hero' with the expectation that it's a facetious crime comedy and an unabashed mindless entertainer, you won't be disappointed."

References

External links

Indian action comedy films
2022 action comedy films
Films set in Hyderabad, India
Films shot in Hyderabad, India
Film productions suspended due to the COVID-19 pandemic
2020s Telugu-language films
Films directed by Sriram Adittya
Films set in Rajahmundry
Films set in Mumbai